Hanna Poulsen (née Ek; born 9 February 1984 in Porvoo) is a Finnish model who was Miss Finland 2005 and a contestant in the Miss Universe 2005 pageant.

She married Henrik Poulsen in 2012. They have two children.

References

Sources

handout showing Ek competing in Miss Universe pageant
published photo of Ek in gown
racist article about 2005 Miss Universe contestants
mention of various Miss Universe contestants

1984 births
Finnish beauty pageant winners
Finnish female models
Living people
Miss Finland winners
Miss Universe 2005 contestants
People from Porvoo